Biomechanical Toy is a scrolling run and gun video game released for arcades by Gaelco in 1995.

Gameplay

The player takes the role of Inguz who has to traverse toyland and shoot evil toys, collect power-ups, and defeat bosses to advance levels.

Plot
A criminal called Scrubby has escaped. He was imprisoned for trying to steal the Magic Pendulum - which brings toys to life. Relik, a cuckoo clock, guards the pendulum. Scrubby appears suddenly and steals the pendulum. A hero called Inguz, are called on to recover the pendulum before the toys' magical world disappears.

Release 
Biomechanical Toy is planned to be included as part of the Gaelco Arcade 1 compilation for Evercade, marking its first console debut.

References

External

Mameworld entry

1995 video games
Arcade video games
Evercade games
Gaelco games
Run and gun games
Video games about toys
Video games developed in Spain
Multiplayer and single-player video games